In geometry, the 5-cell is the convex 4-polytope with Schläfli symbol {3,3,3}. It is a 5-vertex four-dimensional object bounded by five tetrahedral cells. It is also known as a C5, pentachoron, pentatope, pentahedroid, or tetrahedral pyramid. It is the 4-simplex (Coxeter's  polytope), the simplest possible convex 4-polytope, and is analogous to the tetrahedron in three dimensions and the triangle in two dimensions. The 5-cell is a 4-dimensional pyramid with a tetrahedral base and four tetrahedral sides.

The regular 5-cell is bounded by five regular tetrahedra, and is one of the six regular convex 4-polytopes (the four-dimensional analogues of the Platonic solids). A regular 5-cell can be constructed from a regular tetrahedron by adding a fifth vertex one edge length distant from all the vertices of the tetrahedron. This cannot be done in 3-dimensional space. The regular 5-cell is a solution to the problem: Make 10 equilateral triangles, all of the same size, using 10 matchsticks, where each side of every triangle is exactly one matchstick, and none of the triangles and match sticks intersect one another. No solution exists in three dimensions.

Alternative names 
 Pentachoron (5-point 4-polytope)
 Hypertetrahedron (4-dimensional analogue of the tetrahedron)
 4-simplex (4-dimensional simplex)
 Tetrahedral pyramid (4-dimensional hyperpyramid with a tetrahedral base)
 Pentatope 
 Pentahedroid (Henry Parker Manning) 
 Pen (Jonathan Bowers: for pentachoron)

Geometry
The 5-cell is the 4-dimensional simplex, the simplest possible 4-polytope. As such it is the first in the sequence of 6 convex regular 4-polytopes (in order of size and complexity).

A 5-cell is formed by any five points which are not all in the same hyperplane (as a tetrahedron is formed by any four points which are not all in the same plane, and a triangle is formed by any three points which are not all in the same line). Therefore any arbitrarily chosen five vertices of any 4-polytope constitute a 5-cell, though not usually a regular 5-cell. The regular 5-cell is not found within any of the other regular convex 4-polytopes except one: the 600-vertex 120-cell is a compound of 120 regular 5-cells.

Structure 
When a net of five tetrahedra is folded up in 4-dimensional space such that each tetrahedron is face bonded to the other four, the resulting 5-cell has a total of 5 vertices, 10 edges and 10 faces. Four edges meet at each vertex, and three tetrahedral cells meet at each edge.

The 5-cell is self-dual (as are all simplexes), and its vertex figure is the tetrahedron. Its maximal intersection with 3-dimensional space is the triangular prism. Its dihedral angle is cos−1(), or approximately 75.52°.

The convex hull of two 5-cells in dual configuration is the disphenoidal 30-cell, dual of the bitruncated 5-cell.

As a configuration 
This configuration matrix represents the 5-cell. The rows and columns correspond to vertices, edges, faces, and cells. The diagonal numbers say how many of each element occur in the whole 5-cell. The nondiagonal numbers say how many of the column's element occur in or at the row's element. This self-dual polytope's matrix is identical to its 180 degree rotation.

Coordinates
The simplest set of Cartesian coordinates is: (2,0,0,0), (0,2,0,0), (0,0,2,0), (0,0,0,2), (φ,φ,φ,φ), with edge length 2, where φ is the golden ratio.

The unit-radius coordinates of an origin-centered regular 5-cell with edge length  are:

The coordinates of the vertices of an origin-centered regular 5-cell with edge length 2 and radius  are:

Another set of origin-centered coordinates in 4-space can be seen as a hyperpyramid with a regular tetrahedral base in 3-space, with edge length 2 and radius :

The vertices of a 4-simplex (with edge  and radius 1) can be more simply constructed on a hyperplane in 5-space, as (distinct) permutations of (0,0,0,0,1) or (0,1,1,1,1); in these positions it is a facet of, respectively, the 5-orthoplex or the rectified penteract.

Geodesics and rotations 
The 5-cell has only digon and monogon central planes through vertices, no two of which are orthogonal. It has 10 digon central planes, where each vertex pair is an edge, not an axis, of the 5-cell. The characteristic isoclinic rotation of the 5-cell has, as invariant planes, one of those 10 digon planes and its completely orthogonal central plane, a 0-gon plane which intersects no 5-cell vertices. Its great circle is the central axis of the 5-cell's zig-zag Petrie pentagon.

There are exactly three different ways to make a circuit of the 5-cell through all 5 vertices along 5 edges, so there are three discrete Hopf fibrations of the 5-cell. Each of the three fibrations corresponds to a distinct left-right pair of isoclinic rotations which each rotate all 5 vertices in a circuit of period 5. The 5-cell has only three distinct isoclines (those circles through all 5 vertices), each of which acts as the single isocline of a right rotation and the single isocline of a left rotation of two different fibrations, and as the Petrie polygon of the 5-cell in the third fibration.

Boerdijk–Coxeter helix 
A 5-cell can be constructed as a Boerdijk–Coxeter helix of five chained tetrahedra, folded into a 4-dimensional ring. The 10 triangle faces can be seen in a 2D net within a triangular tiling, with 6 triangles around every vertex, although folding into 4-dimensions causes edges to coincide. The purple edges form a regular pentagon which is the Petrie polygon of the 5-cell. The blue edges connect every second vertex, forming a pentagram which is the Clifford polygon of the 5-cell. The pentagram's blue edges are the chords of the 5-cell's isocline, the circular rotational path its vertices take during an isoclinic rotation, also known as a Clifford displacement.

Projections
The A4 Coxeter plane projects the 5-cell into a regular pentagon and pentagram. The A3 Coxeter plane projection of the 5-cell is that of a square pyramid. The A2 Coxeter plane projection of the regular 5-cell is that of a triangular bipyramid (two tetrahedra joined face-to-face) with the two opposite vertices centered.

Irregular 5-cells 
In the case of simplexes such as the 5-cell, certain irregular forms are in some sense more fundamental than the regular form. Although regular 5-cells cannot fill 4-space or the regular 4-polytopes, there are irregular 5-cells which do. These characteristic 5-cells are the fundamental domains of the different symmetry groups which give rise to the various 4-polytopes.

Orthoschemes
A 4-orthoscheme is a 5-cell where all 10 faces are right triangles. An orthoscheme is an irregular simplex that is the convex hull of a tree in which all edges are mutually perpendicular. In a 4-dimensional orthoscheme, the tree consists of four perpendicular edges connecting all five vertices in a linear path that makes three right-angled turns. The elements of an orthoscheme are also orthoschemes (just as the elements of a regular simplex are also regular simplexes). Each tetrahedral cell of a 4-orthoscheme is a 3-orthoscheme, and each triangular face is a 2-orthoscheme (a right triangle).

Orthoschemes are the characteristic simplexes of the regular polytopes, because each regular polytope is generated by reflections in the bounding facets of its particular characteristic orthoscheme. For example, the special case of the 4-orthoscheme with equal-length perpendicular edges is the characteristic orthoscheme of the 4-cube (also called the tesseract or 8-cell), the 4-dimensional analogue of the 3-dimensional cube. Therefore this 4-orthoscheme fits within the 4-cube, and the 4-cube (like every regular convex polytope) can be dissected into instances of its characteristic orthoscheme.

A 3-orthoscheme is easily illustrated, but a 4-orthoscheme is more difficult to visualize. A 4-orthoscheme is a tetrahedral pyramid with a 3-orthoscheme as its base. It has four more edges than the 3-orthoscheme, joining the four vertices of the base to its apex (the fifth vertex of the 5-cell). Pick out any one of the 3-orthoschemes of the six shown in the 3-cube illustration. Notice that it touches four of the cube's eight vertices, and those four vertices are linked by a 3-edge path that makes two right-angled turns. Imagine that this 3-orthoscheme is the base of a 4-orthoscheme, so that from each of those four vertices, an unseen 4-orthoscheme edge connects to a fifth apex vertex (which is outside the 3-cube and does not appear in the illustration at all). Although the four additional edges all reach the same apex vertex, they will all be of different lengths. The first of them, at one end of the 3-edge orthogonal path, extends that path with a fourth orthogonal  edge by making a third 90 degree turn and reaching perpendicularly into the fourth dimension to the apex. The second of the four additional edges is a  diagonal of a cube face (not of the illustrated 3-cube, but of another of the tesseract's eight 3-cubes). The third additional edge is a  diagonal of a 3-cube (again, not the original illustrated 3-cube). The fourth additional edge (at the other end of the orthogonal path) is a long diameter of the tesseract itself, of length . It reaches through the exact center of the tesseract to the antipodal vertex (a vertex of the opposing 3-cube), which is the apex. Thus the characteristic 5-cell of the 4-cube has four  edges, three  edges, two  edges, and one  edge.

The 4-cube  can be dissected into 24 such 4-orthoschemes  eight different ways, with six 4-orthoschemes surrounding each of four orthogonal  tesseract long diameters. The 4-cube can also be dissected into 384 smaller instances of this same characteristic 4-orthoscheme, just one way, by all of its symmetry hyperplanes at once, which divide it into 384 4-orthoschemes that all meet at the center of the 4-cube.

More generally, any regular polytope can be dissected into g instances of its characteristic orthoscheme that all meet at the regular polytope's center. The number g is the order of the polytope, the number of reflected instances of its characteristic orthoscheme that comprise the polytope when a single mirror-surfaced orthoscheme instance is reflected in its own facets. More generally still, characteristic simplexes are able to fill uniform polytopes because they possess all the requisite elements of the polytope. They also possess all the requisite angles between elements (from 90 degrees on down). The characteristic simplexes are the genetic codes of polytopes: like a Swiss Army knife, they contain one of everything needed to construct the polytope by replication.

Every regular polytope, including the regular 5-cell, has its characteristic orthoscheme. There is a 4-orthoscheme which is the characteristic 5-cell of the regular 5-cell. It is a tetrahedral pyramid based on the characteristic tetrahedron of the regular tetrahedron. The regular 5-cell  can be dissected into 120 instances of this characteristic 4-orthoscheme  just one way, by all of its symmetry hyperplanes at once, which divide it into 120 4-orthoschemes that all meet at the center of the regular 5-cell.

The characteristic 5-cell (4-orthoscheme) of the regular 5-cell has four more edges than its base characteristic tetrahedron (3-orthoscheme), which join the four vertices of the base to its apex (the fifth vertex of the 4-orthoscheme, at the center of the regular 5-cell).

Isometries
There are many lower symmetry forms of the 5-cell, including these found as uniform polytope vertex figures:

The tetrahedral pyramid is a special case of a 5-cell, a polyhedral pyramid, constructed as a regular tetrahedron base in a 3-space hyperplane, and an apex point above the hyperplane. The four sides of the pyramid are made of triangular pyramid cells.

Many uniform 5-polytopes have tetrahedral pyramid vertex figures with Schläfli symbols∨{3,3}.

Other uniform 5-polytopes have irregular 5-cell vertex figures. The symmetry of a vertex figure of a uniform polytope is represented by removing the ringed nodes of the Coxeter diagram.

Compound 
The compound of two 5-cells in dual configurations can be seen in this A5 Coxeter plane projection, with a red and blue 5-cell vertices and edges. This compound has [[3,3,3]] symmetry, order 240. The intersection of these two 5-cells is a uniform bitruncated 5-cell.  =  ∩ .

This compound can be seen as the 4D analogue of the 2D hexagram &lbrace;&rbrace; and the 3D compound of two tetrahedra.

Related polytopes and honeycombs 
The pentachoron (5-cell) is the simplest of 9 uniform polychora constructed from the [3,3,3] Coxeter group.

It is in the {p,3,3} sequence of regular polychora with a tetrahedral vertex figure: the tesseract {4,3,3} and 120-cell {5,3,3} of Euclidean 4-space, and the hexagonal tiling honeycomb {6,3,3} of hyperbolic space.

It is one of three {3,3,p} regular 4-polytopes with tetrahedral cells, along with the 16-cell {3,3,4} and 600-cell {3,3,5}. The order-6 tetrahedral honeycomb {3,3,6} of hyperbolic space also has tetrahedral cells.

It is self-dual like the 24-cell {3,4,3}, having a palindromic {3,p,3} Schläfli symbol.

Notes

Citations

References 
 T. Gosset: On the Regular and Semi-Regular Figures in Space of n Dimensions, Messenger of Mathematics, Macmillan, 1900
 H.S.M. Coxeter: 
 
 p. 120, §7.2. see illustration Fig 7.2A
 p. 296, Table I (iii): Regular Polytopes, three regular polytopes in n-dimensions (n≥5)
 
 Kaleidoscopes: Selected Writings of H.S.M. Coxeter, edited by F. Arthur Sherk, Peter McMullen, Anthony C. Thompson, Asia Ivic Weiss, Wiley-Interscience Publication, 1995,  
 (Paper 22) H.S.M. Coxeter, Regular and Semi Regular Polytopes I, [Math. Zeit. 46 (1940) 380-407, MR 2,10]
 (Paper 23) H.S.M. Coxeter, Regular and Semi-Regular Polytopes II, [Math. Zeit. 188 (1985) 559-591]
 (Paper 24) H.S.M. Coxeter, Regular and Semi-Regular Polytopes III, [Math. Zeit. 200 (1988) 3-45]
 
 John H. Conway, Heidi Burgiel, Chaim Goodman-Strass, The Symmetries of Things 2008,  (Chapter 26. pp. 409: Hemicubes: 1n1)
 Norman Johnson Uniform Polytopes, Manuscript (1991)
 N.W. Johnson: The Theory of Uniform Polytopes and Honeycombs, Ph.D. (1966)

External links
 
 
 Der 5-Zeller (5-cell) Marco Möller's Regular polytopes in R4 (German)
 Jonathan Bowers, Regular polychora
 Java3D Applets
 pyrochoron

 005